Richard Currey (born 1949) is an American author born in West Virginia. He is known for his writing of the Vietnam era and of West Virginia. He is the recipient of two NEA fellowships.

Early life and education 
Born in Parkersburg, West Virginia, Currey went on to serve as a Navy medical corpsman between 1968 and 1972. He enrolled at West Virginia University after his time in the service, and stayed there until 1974. He attended Howard University, an HBCU, from 1974 until 1979.

Career 
In his writings, Currey often reflects on his own experiences of military service, family, and living in West Virginia. He has been nominated for the Pulitzer Prize, is an O. Henry Award winner, a PEN/Hemingway Award finalist, and has served as the DH Lawrence Fellow in Literature and writer in residence at The University of New Mexico. He is a speaker on the topic of the intersection of art and the military.

Bibliography 
  Crossing Over: A Vietnam Journal (1980) Applewood Books, reprinted by Santa Fe Writers Project, 2018
  Fatal Light (1988) E. P. Dutton, reprinted by Santa Fe Writers Project, 2009
  The Wars of Heaven (1990) Houghton Mifflin Harcourt, reprinted by Santa Fe Writers Project, 2014
  Medicine For Sale: Commercialism vs. Professionalism (1992) Whittle Communications
  Lost Highway (1997) Houghton Mifflin Harcourt

References 

1949 births
Living people
West Virginia University alumni
United States Army personnel of the Vietnam War
American writers
People from Parkersburg, West Virginia
Writers from West Virginia
Military personnel from West Virginia
Howard University alumni